Frans Thissen (9 November 1909 – ?) was a Belgian rower. He competed at the 1936 Summer Olympics in Berlin with the men's coxless pair where they were eliminated in the semi-final.

References

1909 births
Year of death unknown
Belgian male rowers
Olympic rowers of Belgium
Rowers at the 1936 Summer Olympics
Sportspeople from Antwerp
European Rowing Championships medalists
20th-century Belgian people